Caenorhabditis nouraguensis is a species of nematodes in the genus Caenorhabditis. Prior to 2014, it was referred to as C. sp. 17. The type isolate was collected in Nouragues, French Guiana.

This species groups with C. yunquensis in the 'Japonica' group, the sister clade to the 'Elegans' group, in the 'Elegans' supergroup.

References

External links 

nouraguensis
Fauna of French Guiana
Nematodes described in 2014